Mark Andrew Vermeulen (born 2 March 1979) is a former Zimbabwean cricketer, who played Test matches and One Day Internationals. He is a right-handed opening batsman and occasional off spin bowler.

Domestic career 
He was former captain of Zimbabwe Under-19 team. Despite his troubles Vermeulen had an excellent 2004–05 season in which he averaged 43.60 in domestic cricket but the rise in his numbers coincided with economic decline and political turmoil and he did not immediately have the opportunity to see if that could translate on the cricket field.

He spent time at the Matabeleland Tuskers, Mid West Rhinos, Mountaineers and Southern Rocks and completed a full house of playing for all the teams in the country when he returned to the Mash Eagles in his home-town of Harare. The domestic season was stalled by a player strike but once it got underway, Vermeulen made good on his commitment. He was the second-highest run scorer in the Logan Cup with 580 runs in seven matches at an average of 64.44.

A complete turnaround was achieved when he was selected for the Zimbabwe A tour of Namibia in February 2009.

International career
He was attacking and naturally athletic, and was first drafted into the Zimbabwe for the second Test against Pakistan in November 2002 at the expense of Guy Whittall.

He made a few decent scores in one-day internationals and played three matches in the 2003 World Cup. He was struck on the head by a ball bowled by Irfan Pathan during Zimbabwe's VB Series campaign in Australia in 2004. In 2009, Vermeulen made a brief comeback for ODIs against South Africa but then disappeared off the radar again while he made his way around Zimbabwe's domestic circuit.

On the 2003–04 tour of Australia, Vermeulen fractured his skull during a One-Day International match against India.  This was the second time this had happened to him inside a year, after the identical injury occurred in February 2003 while practising.  Successful surgery has limited the impact that these injuries have had on Vermeulen's cricketing career.

Although he had a side career in golf, Vermeulen decided to make the 2013–14 season his final go at trying to be an international cricketer. In July 2014, he was given hope that his international career would be resurrected when he was picked for the Zimbabwe A side to play Afghanistan. He scored a century in the first four-day match and could not be overlooked for the one-off Test against South Africa which followed. Brendan Taylor described him as calm, for a change.

A decade after last playing in whites for Zimbabwe, Vermeulen made a comeback in August 2014. In July 2009, the comeback was complete with Vermeulen earning a call up to the Zimbabwe squad for the One Day International Series against Bangladesh. In the first match of the series, played at Queens Sports Club, Bulawayo, Vermeulen scored 92 in Zimbabwe's score of 207, before being dismissed by being run out.

Disciplinary problems 
He has had a number of disciplinary problems. He was sent home from Zimbabwe's tour of England in 2003 after ignoring management instructions to travel with the rest of the squad. Then in 2006 he was banned from all cricket played under the auspices of the England and Wales Cricket Board after a violent altercation with spectators at a match between Ashton and his club, Werneth in the Central Lancashire League. The original ban imposed was ten years, but on appeal it was reduced to three years, two of which were suspended. The ban took effect from 1 April 2007.

In October 2015, Vermeulen was banned from all cricket by Zimbabwe Cricket after posting racist comments on social media, where he compared black Zimbabweans to apes.

Accusation of arson 
In November 2006, Vermeulen was held by police after apparently fleeing the scene of a suspicious fire at the Zimbabwean Cricket Academy in Harare. A fire had also been set at the Zimbabwe Cricket headquarters. ZCU Managing Director Ozias Bvute confirmed that Vermeulen was being held "for questioning" in the incident. Vermeulen was formally charged with arson in the incident on 2 November. In January 2008, he was cleared on grounds of mental illness, and in February announced that he was hoping to make a comeback.

In May 2008, Vermeulen offered to help rebuild the academy he burnt by using a percentage of his earnings that he would get by playing for Zimbabwe again.

Style 
At his most comfortable against pace bowling, Vermeulen was a back-foot player by inclination, particularly strong on the cut, pull and hook shots, although he was also a sweet timer of the ball through the covers. He was an excellent slip fielder, and an occasional offbreak bowler.

References

External links
 telegraph
 HowSTAT! statistical profile on Mark Vermeulen
 Interview with Mark Vermeulen at Cricinfo

1979 births
Living people
Cricketers from Harare
Alumni of Prince Edward School
People educated at Malvern College
White Zimbabwean sportspeople
Afrikaner people
Zimbabwean people of South African descent
Zimbabwean Under-19 ODI captains
Cricketers at the 2003 Cricket World Cup
Zimbabwean cricketers
Zimbabwe One Day International cricketers
Zimbabwe Test cricketers
CFX Academy cricketers
Matabeleland cricketers
Mashonaland A cricketers
Mid West Rhinos cricketers